Klaus Gattermann (born 8 January 1961 in Zwiesel) is a German former alpine skier who competed in the 1984 Winter Olympics.

External links
 sports-reference.com

1961 births
Living people
People from Regen (district)
Sportspeople from Lower Bavaria
German male alpine skiers
Olympic alpine skiers of West Germany
Alpine skiers at the 1984 Winter Olympics
20th-century German people